Margaret Philipse (also Margarita Philipse, baptized Feb. 4, 1733, died 1752) was the daughter of Frederick Philipse II, 2nd Lord of Philipsburg Manor of Westchester County, New York.  

She was, along with her brother Philip (1724–1768) and sisters Susanna (1727–1822) and Mary (1730–1825), a one-quarter heir to the roughly  "Highland Patent" of her father (later to become known as the Philipse Patent, and in time today's Putnam County of southeastern New York).  She died intestate, and her share was equally divided among her named living siblings.  A redistribution of the land among them was done in 1754.

As all the Philipses were Loyalists during the Revolutionary War, Margaret's siblings had their lands seized in 1779 by the Revolutionary government of the Province of New York and were never compensated for their loss.

See also
 Philipse family
 Her grandmother, Margaret Hardenbroeck
 Philipse Patent
 Dutchess County, New York#The Patents
 The Oblong

References

External links
 The Example of Married Women in New Netherland and New York in the Seventeenth Century, Michael Gherke. Image of Margaret Philipse, 1733-1752 by John Wollaston, c.1750, Oil on canvas, 29 x 24 inches
 Putnam's Past
 Boundary Changes of Putnam County
 Her c. 1750 portrait by John Wollaston

1733 births
1752 deaths
American members of the Dutch Reformed Church
American people of Dutch descent
People of the Province of New York
Margaret 1733